Joint Strike Fighter may refer to one of the following:

 F-35 Lightning II, a fighter aircraft under development by Lockheed Martin for the militaries of the US and several other nations
 Lockheed Martin F-35 Lightning II procurement
 Joint Strike Fighter program, the U.S. Department of Defense contract competition that resulted in the F-35's selection
 Joint Strike Fighter (video game), a computer game portraying aircraft from the competition